Flat Hill is a mountain located in the Catskill Mountains of New York east-southeast of Sundown. Steiny Hill is located east and Pople Hill is located northwest of Flat Hill.

References

Mountains of Ulster County, New York
Mountains of New York (state)